Deane Pappas (born 12 December 1967) is a South African professional golfer. He has won twice on both the Southern Africa-based Sunshine Tour and on the second-tier United States based Buy.com Tour, now the Web.com Tour.

Pappas was born in Phalaborwa, Limpopo province, South Africa, as the second youngest of four brothers, three of them to became professional golfers. He was a three-time All-American at the University of Arkansas, where he was a teammate of John Daly.

At the 1988 Eisenhower Trophy at Ullna Golf Club in Stockholm, Sweden, Pappas together with his brother Sean, was part of the four-men team representing Greece.

Pappas turned professional in 1992 and joined the Sunshine Tour in 1994. He won for the first time on the tour in 2001, at the prestigious South African PGA Championship. He claimed his second tour victory in 2009 at the Dimension Data Pro-Am.

Between 1996 and 2007, Pappas played extensively in the United States, winning two tournaments on the Buy.com Tour, the first in 2000 and the second the following year He played three seasons on the PGA Tour, the first in 1999 after finishing tied for second place at qualifying school, but has never been able to retain his card.. Pappas and his younger brother, Brenden, in 2001 became the first brothers to graduate simultaneously to the PGA Tour by finishing in the top 15 on the Buy.com Tour money list.

Pappas lives in Arkansas in the United States with his wife Shona, and two children, Callen and Devyn. They manage Ridgepointe Country Club in Jonesboro.

Professional wins (5)

Sunshine Tour wins (2)

Buy.com Tour wins (2)

Other wins (1)
2002 Nelson Mandela Invitational (with Hugh Baiocchi)

Results in major championships

CUT = missed the halfway cut
Note: Pappas only played in the U.S. Open.

Team appearances
Amateur
Eisenhower Trophy (representing Greece): 1988

See also
1998 PGA Tour Qualifying School graduates
2001 Buy.com Tour graduates
2003 PGA Tour Qualifying School graduates

References

External links

South African male golfers
Greek male golfers
Arkansas Razorbacks men's golfers
Sunshine Tour golfers
PGA Tour golfers
Korn Ferry Tour graduates
People from Phalaborwa
1967 births
Living people